Aquitaine was a region of France, now part of the Nouvelle-Aquitaine region. 

Aquitaine may also refer to:

 Aquitaine Basin
 French ship Aquitaine, two ships of the French Navy
 TER Aquitaine, the regional rail network serving the Aquitaine région
 Aquitaine (train), an express train that ran between Bordeaux and Paris
 The Duchy of Aquitaine, a historic fiefdom in France
 Aquitaine (the city), Attis Aquitaine, or Invidia Aquitaine in Jim Butcher's Codex Alera book series

See also

 Aquitania